Liburdi is a surname. Notable people with the surname include:

Maryse Liburdi, American businesswoman
Mauro Liburdi (born 1982), Italian basketball player
Michael T. Liburdi (born 1977), American lawyer and judge